Sweet Sixteen is a 2002 drama film directed by Ken Loach. Set in Scotland, the film tells the story of Liam, a teenage boy from a troubled background who dreams of starting afresh with his mother as soon as she has completed her prison term. Liam's attempts to raise money for the two of them are set against the backdrop of the Inverclyde towns of Greenock, Port Glasgow and the coast at Gourock.

The film is often shown with subtitles because, as with many of Loach's films, the dialogue is extensively in a local dialect, in this case the Inverclyde variant of Scottish English and Scots, a similar dialect and accent to Glaswegian.

Plot

Scottish teenager Liam and his friends exemplify the violent ned subculture; they no longer attend school, and instead hang around isolated areas or wander aimlessly all day long. They obtain money by illicitly selling untaxed cigarettes in a pub and defy the police. Liam's mother is currently in prison for a crime she did not commit. She will be released in a few weeks, in time for Liam's 16th birthday. Her boyfriend Stan works as a drug dealer with Liam's grandfather, Rab.

Stan and Rab take Liam to visit his mother in Cornton Vale Prison, attempting to force him to smuggle drugs to her while they create a distraction. When Liam refuses to cooperate, his companions beat him up on the drive home; he fights back and flees. Liam arrives back to find that he has been expelled from his grandfather's flat, and his belongings thrown down into the front garden. Liam then moves into his sister Chantelle's nearby home in Port Glasgow. She implores Liam to do something more constructive with his own life.

When Liam takes Chantelle's young son Calum for a walk along Greenock Esplanade, his friend Pinball arrives in a stolen car and insists on taking them joyriding along the coast. They drive up through the Cloch caravan (trailer) park where Liam sees a caravan for sale. Liam wishes to escape with his mother and sister to the seaside and live in the caravan, away from Stan and Rab's wrath. To afford it, he and Pinball steal a delivery of drugs from Stan's house and sell them. They soon develop "entrepreneur skills" and raise several thousand pounds, which they pay as a deposit towards the caravan in Liam's mother's name.

Liam's efforts attract the attention of the local drug "godfather", Tony Douglas. Liam agrees to work with them after the local godfather tells him to "stay away from our shops". Pinball, meanwhile, is thrown into the health club showers due to his disrespectful behaviour towards the dealer, and vows revenge. Liam and Pinball continue selling drugs locally, with the help of Liam's other friends who deliver pizzas. Liam and Pinball meet again with members of the drug godfather's gang, and Liam joins them in their car. Pinball is kicked out, angering him further; the gang members advise Liam to "dump" Pinball for good. They take Liam to a Glasgow nightclub and instruct him that he has to kill someone to join the gang. Liam attempts to do so, but is stopped by the gang, who inform him it was a test—which he has passed.

Liam, Chantelle, Calum and Suzanne (Chantelle's friend) drive to the caravan for a picnic, only to discover that it has been burned down. Liam believes Stan did it. That evening, Pinball turns up in Douglas's (stolen) car, telling Liam that he wants revenge. He proceeds to crash the car into the health club. Liam speaks to the godfather in the morning and is ordered to kill Pinball problem. The next morning, Pinball—aware of Liam's intentions—tries to stab Liam, before proudly revealing that he burnt down the caravan. He then cuts his own face in rage. Liam reassures his injured friend after phoning for an ambulance, but he then notifies the godfather that the deed has "been done", implying that he has indeed murdered Pinball.

Douglas promises to buy Liam an upscale apartment, and on the day before his birthday, Liam's mother is released from prison and taken to this new house on the coast of Gourock where she is welcomed with a party. She appears uneasy, and the next morning is found to have escaped to Stan's house. Liam blames this on Chantelle, who is now fully aware that Liam is dealing drugs. She attempts to warn him about their mother probably not being so thankful for Liam's efforts because she is too devoted to Stan, but this only provokes Liam further. An enraged Liam goes to Stan's house, trying to convince his mother to return to their new home, only to be insulted by Stan. In a struggle, Liam stabs Stan.

Liam walks alone on the stony beach. He is phoned by Chantelle, who reminds him that the day is his 16th birthday. She also tells him that the police have been looking for him, but that after everything that he has done, Chantelle still loves him. He walks towards the sea.

Cast
 Martin Compston as Liam
 Annmarie Fulton as Chantelle
 William Ruane as Pinball
 Junior Walker as Nighttime
 Gary McCormack as Stan

Soundtrack

The Arrival of the Night Queen from The Magic Flute by Wolfgang Amadeus Mozart – Performed by Failoni Kamerazenekar and Helen Kwon
I'll Stand by You – Written by Tom Kelly, Billy Steinberg and Chrissie Hynde – Performed by The Pretenders
Burn in Hell – Written by Otten/Skog/Tell/Torstensen – Performed by Clawfinger
Dogman – Written by Tristan Hervo – Performed by Wide Open Cage
Bushes – Written by Markus Nikolai, Theo Krieger, Clair Dietrich – Performed by Markus Nikolai
Ain't No Love – Written by Melanie Williams, Jimi Goodwin, Jez Williams, Andy Williams – Performed by Sub Sub
Let Me Entertain You – Written by Robbie Williams and Guy Chambers – Performed by Robbie Williams
You Stole the Sun from my Heart – Written by James Dean Bradfield, Nicky Wire, Sean Moore – Performed by Manic Street Preachers
I Go to Sleep – Written and Composed by Ray Davies – Performed by The Pretenders

Reception
The premiere of Sweet Sixteen was at the UGC in central Glasgow on 1 October 2002. Sweet Sixteen received very positive reviews, currently holding a 97% "fresh" rating on Rotten Tomatoes from 88 critics; the consensus states: "A bleak, but heartbreaking coming-of-age tale that resonates with truth." Sweet Sixteen was nominated for the Palme d'Or and won the Best Screenplay Award at the 2002 Cannes Film Festival. Sweet Sixteen inspired Italian singer-songwriter Lucio Dalla for the 2007 song Liam.

Criticism of BBFC classification
Use of the words fuck (313 times) and cunt (about 20 times) led the British Board of Film Classification to forbid the film to viewers under the age of 18. Spain followed this decision, but other countries, like France and Germany (not under 12) had a different rating system. Loach and Paul Laverty protested against the British procedure in The Guardian newspaper.

Laverty asserted that this was "censorship" and "class prejudice" because he got a lot of information to write his scenario from people around Scotland, many of whom were not 18, and were therefore denied the opportunity to see the film. The BBFC acknowledged that there is some variation across Britain in how offensive some words are perceived, but stood by the 18 certificate and argued that most of the publicity around the film was "mostly generated by the disgruntled film-maker".

Screenings in Inverclyde, Martin Compston's birthplace, where the film was shot, were shown under a 15 certificate.

References

External links
 
 
 
 
 
 Review: 'Losing Liam' at Bright Lights Film Journal, 2005

2002 films
2002 crime drama films
2002 independent films
2000s British films
2000s coming-of-age drama films
2000s English-language films
2000s German films
2000s Spanish films
2000s teen drama films
British coming-of-age drama films
British crime drama films
British independent films
British teen drama films
English-language German films
English-language Scottish films
English-language Spanish films
European Film Awards winners (films)
Films about drugs
Films directed by Ken Loach
Films scored by George Fenton
Films set in Scotland
Films shot in Glasgow
German coming-of-age drama films
German crime drama films
German independent films
German teen drama films
Greenock
Icon Productions films
Scots-language films
Scottish drama films
Spanish coming-of-age drama films
Spanish crime drama films
Spanish independent films
Spanish teen drama films
Teen crime films
English-language drama films